Bandazun, also known as Bandāzān, is a village in Nasrabad Rural District, in the Central District of Taft County, Yazd Province, Iran. At the 2006 census, its population was 9, in 7 families.

References 

Populated places in Taft County